During the Vietnam War, thousands of U.S. aircraft were lost to antiaircraft artillery (AAA), surface-to-air missiles (SAMs), and fighter interceptors (MiG)s. The great majority of U.S. combat losses in all areas of Southeast Asia were to AAA. The Royal Australian Air Force also flew combat and airlift missions in South Vietnam, as did the Republic of Vietnam. Among fixed-wing aircraft, more F-4 Phantoms were lost than any other type in service with any nation.

The United States lost 578 UAVs (554 over Vietnam and 24 over China).

There were about 11,846 U.S helicopters that served in the Vietnam War. The U.S records showing 5,607 helicopter losses

In total, the United States military lost in Vietnam almost 10,000 aircraft, helicopters and UAVs (3,744 planes,<ref>Assessing the Wars Costs. Colonel Donovan. Vietnam Magazine, April 1996</ref> 5,607 helicopters and 578 UAVs ).

The Republic of Vietnam lost 1,018 aircraft and helicopters from January 1964 to September 1973. 877 Republic of Vietnam aircraft were captured at war's end (1975) Of the 2750 aircraft and helicopters received by South Vietnam, only about 308 survived (240 flew to Thailand or US warships and 68 returned to the United States).

The United States, along with their allies (The Republic of Vietnam, South Korean, Australian, Thailand, New Zealand), lost about 12,500 aircraft, helicopters and UAVs.

North Vietnam lost 150 – 170 aircraft and helicopters.

United States aircraft

United States Air Force
All told, the U.S. Air Force flew 5.25 million sorties over South Vietnam, North Vietnam, northern and southern Laos, and Cambodia, losing 2,251 aircraft: 1,737 to hostile action, and 514 in accidents. 2,197 of the losses were fixed-wing, and the remainder rotary-wing. The USAF sustained approximately 0.4 losses per 1,000 sorties during the conflict, which compared favorably with a 2.0 rate in Korea and a 9.7 figure during World War II.Hobson 2001.

USAF fixed-wing

 A-1 Skyraider—191 total, 150 in combat
 First loss: A-1E 52-132465 (1st Air Commando Squadron [ACS], 34th Tactical Group [TG]) shot down during night training mission on 29 August 1964 near Bien Hoa, SVN (Capt Richard Dean Goss KIA, 1 VNAF observer [name unknown] KIA)
 Final loss: A-1H 52-139738 (1st Special Operations Squadron, 56th Special Operations Wing) which was shot down 28 September 1972 (pilot was rescued by an Air America helicopter)
 A-7D Corsair II—6 total, 4 in combat
 First loss: 71–0310 (355th Tactical Fighter Squadron, 354th TFW) on 2 December 1972 shot down on a CSAR mission in Laos (Capt Anthony Shine KIA)
 Final loss: 70–0945 (354th TFW) shot down in Cambodia on 25 May 1973 (Capt Jeremiah Costello KIA)
 A-26 Invader—22 total
 First loss: B-26B 44-35530 (Detachment 2A, 1st ACG) shot down in IV CTZ on the night of 4–5 November 1962, killing the 3 crew
 Final loss: A-26A 64-17646 (609th SOS, 56th SOW) lost over Laos on the night of 7–8 July 1969, killing both crewmen
 A-37 Dragonfly—22 total
 First loss: 1967, final loss: 1972

 AC-47 Spooky—19 total, 12 in combat
 First loss: 1965, final loss: 1969
 AC-119 Shadow/Stinger—6 total, 2 in combat
 First loss: AC-119G 52-5907 (Det.1, 17th SOS, 14th SOW) which crashed on take-off from Tan Son Nhut, SVN, on 11 October 1969, killing 6 of 10 crewmen
 Final loss: AC-119K 53-7826 (18th SOS, 56th SOW out of Bien Hoa AB), shot down by 37mm flak over An Lộc, SVN, on 2 May 1972, 7 survivors of 10 crewmen
 AC-130 Spectre—6 total, all in combat
 First loss: AC-130A 54-1629 (16th SOS, 8th TFW) hit by 37mm anti-aircraft gun over Laos and crash-landed at Ubon RTAFB, 2 crewmen died (one died of injuries before reaching Ubon) but 11 others survived
 Final loss: 1972

 B-52 Stratofortress—31 total (17 in combat, two more being scrapped after sustaining battle damage, and 12 crashed in flight accidents)
 First losses were operational (non-combat) mid-air collision 2 B-52F 57-0047 and 57-0179 (441st Bomb Squadron, 320th Bomb Wing), 18 June 1965, South China Sea during air refueling orbit, 8 of 12 crewmen killed
 Final loss: B-52D 55-0056 (307th Bomb Wing Provisional) to SAM 4 January 1973, crew rescued from Gulf of Tonkin
 B-57 Canberra—56 total, 38 in combat
 First loss: 1964, final loss: 1970
 C-5A Galaxy—1 total, 0 in combat
 Crashed while attempting emergency landing at Tan Son Nhut AB 4 April 1975, as part of Operation Babylift. 
 C-7 Caribou—19 total, 9 in combat
 First loss: C-7B 62-4161 (459th Tactical Airlift Squadron, 483d Tactical Airlift Wing) which was hit by a US 155mm shell on 3 August 1967 in SVN killing the 3 crewmen. Note: there were two fatal crashes during Operation Red Leaf transition training of USAF crews in Army CV-2's, on 4 and 28 October 1966.
 Final loss: C-7B 62-12584 (483d TAW) which crashed in SVN on 13 January 1971, all 4 crewmen survived.
 C-47 Skytrain—21 total
 A C-47 was the very first USAF aircraft lost in the SEA conflict, C-47B 44-76330 (315th Air Division) on TDY at Vientiane, Laos which was shot down by the Pathet Lao on 23 March 1961 killing 7 of the 8 crewmen. The sole survivor, US Army Maj. Lawrence Bailey was captured and held until August 1962.
 Final loss: EC-47Q 43-48636 (361st Tactical Electronic Warfare Squadron, 56th SOW) shot down in Laos on the night of 04/5 4–5 February 1973, killing all 8 crewmen.
 C-123 Provider—53 total, 21 in combat
 First loss: C-123B 56-4370 attached to the 464th TAW which came down on an Operation Ranch Hand (defoliation) training flight between Bien Hoa and Vung Tau, SVN on 2 February 1962
 Final loss: 1971

 C-130 Hercules—55 total, 34 in combat
 First loss: C-130A 57-0475 (817th Troop Carrier Squadron, 6315th Operations Group) on 24 April 1965, a Blind Bat flareship that crashed into high ground near Korat Royal Thai Air Force Base, Thailand, attempting to land in bad weather with a heavy load, two engine failures, and low fuel, killing all six crewmen. This was the 14th recorded loss of a C-130 to all causes.
 Final loss: C-130E 72-1297 (314th TAW) destroyed by rocket fire at Tan Son Nhut AB on 28 April 1975.
 C-141 Starlifter—2 total, 0 in combat
 First loss: C-141A 65-9407 (62d Military Airlift Wing) destroyed in a night runway collision with a USMC A-6 at Danang, SVN on 23 March 1967 killing 5 of the 6 crewmen.
 Final loss: C-141A 66-0127 (4th Military Airlift Squadron, 62d MAW) crashed soon after take-off from Cam Ranh Bay, SVN on 13 April 1967 killing 6 of the 8-man crew.
 E/RB-66 Destroyer—14 total
 First loss: RB-66B 53-0452 (Det 1, 41st Tactical Reconnaissance Squadron, 6250th Combat Support Group) which crashed 22–23 October 1965 west of Pleiku, SVN killing the crew.
 Final loss: EB-66B 42nd TEWS, 388th TFS lost to engine failure on 23 December 1972 during Operation Linebacker II. 3 crewmen were KIA.
 EC-121 BatCat—2 total, 0 combat
 First loss: EC-121R 67-24193 (554th Reconnaissance Squadron, 553d RW) crashed 25 April 1969 on take-off in a thunderstorm from Korat RTAFB, killing all 18 crewmen.
 Final loss: EC-121R 67-21495 (554th RS) crashed on approach to Korat RTAFB on 6 September 1969, 4 of the 16 men were killed.
 F-4 Phantom II—445 total, 382 in combat
 First loss: operational (non-combat), F-4C 64-0674 (45TH TFS, 15th TFW) which ran out of fuel after strike in SVN on 9 June 1965; first combat loss F-4C 64-0685 (45th TFS, 15th TFW) shot down Ta Chan, NW NVN on 20 June 1965. 9 of the losses were parked aircraft struck by rockets.
 Final loss: F-4D 66-8747 (432d TRW) on 29 June 1973.
 F-5 Freedom Fighter—9 total
 First loss: 1965, final loss: 1967
 F-100 Super Sabre—243 total, 198 in combat
 First loss: 1964, final loss: 1971
 F-102 Delta Dagger—14 total, 7 in combat
 First loss: 1964, final loss: 1967. 4 of the combat losses were parked aircraft.
 F-104 Starfighter—14 total, 9 in combat
 First loss: 56–0937 (476th TFS, 497th TFW) shot down by enemy ground fire during CAS mission near Tri Dao, Vietnam, on 29 June 1965, pilot Capt. R. Cole rescued
 Final loss: 57-0922 (435th TFS, 8th TFW) operational loss due to engine failure on 14 May 1967 in Thailand, pilot name unknown, survived

 F-105D Thunderchief—335 total, 283 in combat
 First loss: 62–4371 (36th TFS, 6441st TFW) written off from battle damage over Laos 14 August 1964, at Korat, Thailand
 Final loss: 61–0153 (44th TFS, 355th TFW) shot down Laos 23 September 1970, pilot Capt. J. W. Newhouse rescued
 F-105F/G Thunderchief—47 total, 37 combat
 First loss: EF-105F 63-8286 (13th TFS, 388th TFW) shot down by AAA RP-6 July 1966, Maj. Roosevelt Hestle and Capt. Charles Morgan KIA
 Final loss: F-105G 63-8359 (Det.1 561st TFS, 388th TFW) shot down by SAM 16 November 1972, RP-3, crew rescued
 F-111A Aardvark—11 total, 6 in combat
 First loss: mission-related TFR failure, 66-0022 (428th TFS 474th TFW, Project Combat Lancer), 28 March 1968, Maj. H.E. Mccann and Capt. D.L. Graham MIA
 Final loss: 67–0111 (474th TFW) mid-air collision over Cambodia, 16 June 1973, both crewmen rescued
 HU-16 Albatross—4 total, 2 in combat
 First loss: 51–5287 to unknown cause 19 June 1965
 51–0058 to unknown cause, 3 July 1965
 51-0071 (33d ARRS) shot down by AAA 14 March 1966, two crewmen killed
 Final loss: 51-7145 (37th ARRS) disappeared 18 October 1966, 7 crewmen KIA-BNR
 KB-50 Superfortress tanker—1 total, 0 combat
 Only loss: KB-50J 48-0065 (421st Air Refueling Squadron Detachment) at Takhli RTAFB which crashed in Thailand on 14 October 1964, all 6 crewmen survived
 KC-135 Stratotanker—3 total, 0 combat
 Two crashes in 1968, one 1969, all operational (non-combat)
 O-1 Bird Dog—172 total, 122 in combat
 First loss: 1963
 Final loss: 1972
 O-2 Skymaster—104 total, 82 in combat
 First loss: 1967
 Final loss: 1972
 OV-10 Bronco—63 total, 47 in combat
 First loss: 1968
 Final loss: 1973
 QU-22 Pave Eagle—8 lost, 7 in combat
 First loss: YQU-22A 68-10531 (554th RS, 553d RW) crashed due to engine failure on 11 June 1969
 Final loss: QU-22B 70-1546 (554th RS) on 25 August 1972, pilot killed
 RF-4C Phantom II—83 total, 76 in combat
 First loss: 1966
 Final loss: 1972

 RF-101 Voodoo—39 total, 33 in combat
 First loss: 1964
 Final loss: 1968
 SR-71A Blackbird—2 total, 0 combat
 First loss: 64-17969 (Det OL-8, 9th Strategic Reconnaissance Wing) suffered engine failure over Thailand on 10 May 1970, both crewmen ejected safely
 Final loss: 64-17978 (Det OL-KA, 9th SRW) crashed on landing at Kadena, Okinawa on 20 July 1972, both crewmen survived
 T-28 Trojan—23 total
 First loss: 1962
 Final loss: 1968
 U-2C "Dragon Lady"—1 total, 0 combat
 Only loss: 56–6690 (349th Strategic Reconnaissance Squadron 100th SRW) which crashed on 8 October 1966 near Bien Hoa, SVN, Maj. Leo J Stewart ejected and was rescued
 U-3B Blue Canoe—1 total, 1 in combat
 Only loss: 60–6058, destroyed on the ground during a VC attack on Tan Son Nhut, SVN on 14 June 1968.
 U-6A Beaver—1 total, 0 in combat
 Only loss: 51-15565 (432d Tactical Reconnaissance Wing) which crashed in Thailand 28 December 1966, both crewmen survived
 U-10D Courier—1 total, 1 in combat
 Only loss: 63-13102 (5th SOS, 14th SOW) shot down 14 August 1969 near Bien Hoa, killing 1/Lt Roger Brown

USAF rotary-wing
 CH/HH-3 Jolly Green Giant—34 total, 25 in combat
 First loss: CH-3E 63-9685 (38th ARRS) to AAA North Vietnam on 6 November 1965, three crewmen POW, one rescued
 Final loss: HH-3E 65-12785 (37th ARRS) 21 November 1970, combat-assaulted inside Son Tay POW camp (Operation Ivory Coast) and deliberately destroyed by U.S. Special Forces
 HH-43B Pedro—13 lost, 8 in combat
 First loss: 63–9713 (38th ARRS) damaged by fire 2 June 1965, crew rescued and aircraft destroyed to prevent its capture
 Final loss: 60–0282 (38th ARRS) crashed Cam Ranh Bay 7 August 1969, crew rescued
 CH/HH-53 Super Jolly—27 total, 17 in combat
 First loss: HH-53C 66-14430 (40th ARRS) in Laos, damaged by gunfire 18 January 1969 crew rescued and aircraft destroyed by bombing to prevent capture
 Last losses: four CH-53s (68-10925, −10926, −10927, 70–1627, all from 21st SOS, 56th SOW) to AAA on 15 May 1975, Koh Tang, Kampuchea, (Mayaguez incident final aircraft losses of Vietnam War)
 UH-1 Iroquois—36 total

United States Navy
Twenty-one aircraft carriers conducted 86 war cruises and operated 9,178 total days on the line in the Gulf of Tonkin. 532 aircraft were lost in combat and 329 more to operational causes, resulting in the deaths of 401 naval aviators, with 64 airmen reported missing and 179 taken prisoner of war.

USN fixed-wing carrier-based
 A-1 Skyraider—65 total, 48 in combat
 First loss: A-1H 139760 (VA-145), to AAA 5 August 1964, Lt.j.g. R. C. Sather KIA (body recovered in 1985)
 Final loss: A-1H 134499 (VA-25), to MIG 14 February 1968, Lt.j.g. J.P. Dunn KIA
 A-3 Skywarrior—7 total, 2 in combat
 First loss: A-3B 142250 (VAH-4), operational loss (non-combat) 22 December 1964, 3 rescued, 1 killed
 Final loss: A-3B 144627 (VAH-4), AAA 8 March 1967, 3 crewmen KIA

 A-4 Skyhawk—282 total, 195 in combat
 First loss: A-4C 149578 (VA-144, USS Constellation), AAA 5 August 1964, Lt.j.g. Everett Alvarez POW (second longest held prisoner)
 Final loss: A-4F 155021 (VA-212), AAA 6 September 1972, pilot rescued
 A-6 Intruder—62 total, 51 in combat
 First loss: A-6A 151584 (VA-75), own bomb detonation Laos 14 July 1965, crew rescued
 Final loss: A-6A 157007 (VA-35), AAA South Vietnam 24 January 1973, crew rescued
 A-7 Corsair—100 total, 55 in combat
 First loss: A-7A 153239 (VA-147), SAM North Vietnam 22 December 1967, LCdr J.M. Hickerson POW
 Final loss: A-7E 156837 (VA-147, USS Constellation), operational loss (non-combat) 29 January 1973, pilot missing
 Operation Frequent Wind loss—"The Enterprise flew 95 sorties in support of the operation, but on no occasion was any ordnance used in anger, although an A-7E was lost to undetermined causes". The pilot was rescued at sea.
 C-1 Trader—4 total, 0 in combat
 First loss: C-1A 146047 (VR-21, USS Independence), non-combat 30 August 1965, 7 passengers and crew rescued
 C-1A 136784 (VR-21, USS Independence), operational loss (non-combat) 12 September 1965, 9 passengers and crew rescued, 1 killed
 C-1A 146016 (Composite Squadron Five VC-5), operational loss (non-combat) 8 August 1967, 3 passengers and 2 crew rescued
 Final loss: C-1A 146054 (Carrier Air Wing 11, USS Kitty Hawk), operational loss (non-combat) 16 January 1968, 7 passengers and crew rescued, 3 killed
 C-2 Greyhound—2 total, 0 in combat
 First loss: C-2A 152796 (VRC-50, USS Constellation), Gulf of Tonkin crash 2 October 1969, 26 passengers and crew killed
 Final loss: C-2A 152793 (VRC-50, USS Ranger), Gulf of Tonkin crash 15 December 1970, 3 crew killed
 E-1 Tracer—3 total, 0 in combat
 First loss: E-1B 148918 (VAW-12, USS Independence), operational loss (non-combat) 22 September 1965, crew rescued
 Final loss: E-1B 148132 (VAW-111), operational loss (non-combat) 8 October 1967, 5 crewmen killed
 E-2 Hawkeye—2 total, 0 in combat
 First loss: E-2A 151711 (VAW-116, USS Coral Sea), 8 April 1970, 5 crewmen killed
 Final loss: E-2B 151719 (VAW-115), 11 June 1971, 5 crewmen missing
 EKA-3 Skywarrior—2 lost, 0 in combat
 First loss: EKA-3B 142400 (VAQ-132, USS America), operational loss (non-combat) 4 July 1970, 3 rescued
 Final loss: EKA-3B 142634 (VAQ-130, USS Ranger), operational loss (non-combat) 21 January 1973, 3 crewmen killed
 EA-1 Skyraider—4 total, 1 in combat
 First loss: EA-1E 139603 (VAW-111), operational loss (non-combat) 15 April 1965, crew rescued
 Final loss: EA-1F 132543 (VAW-13), operational loss (non-combat) 10 September 1966, crew rescued

 F-4 Phantom—138 total, 75 in combat
 First loss: F-4B 151412 (VA-142, USS Constellation), operational loss (non-combat) 13 November 1964, crew rescued
 Final combat loss (also last USN combat loss of war): F-4J 155768 (VF-143), AAA South Vietnam 27 January 1973, Cdr H.H. Hall (MIA) and LCdr P.A. Kientzler (POW)
 Final loss: F-4J 158361 (VF-21, USS Ranger), operational loss (non-combat) 29 January 1973, crew killed
 F-8 Crusader—118 total, 57 in combat
 First loss: F-8D (VF-111, USS Kitty Hawk), to AAA over Laos 7 June 1964, LCdr C.D. Lynn rescued
 Final loss: (operational) F-8J 150887 (VF-191, USS Oriskany) 26 November 1972, pilot rescued
 KA-3 Skywarrior—2 lost, 0 in combat
 First loss: KA-3B 142658 (VAH-4, USS Oriskany), operational loss (non-combat) 28 July 1967, 1 crewmen rescued, 2 killed
 Final loss: KA-3B 138943 (VAH-10, USS Coral Sea), operational loss (non-combat) 17 February 1969, 3 crewmen killed

 RA-5 Vigilante—27 total, 18 in combat
 First loss: RA-5C 149306 (RVAH-5, USS Ranger), operational loss (non-combat) 9 December 1965, 2 crewmen killed
 Final loss: RA-5C 156633 (RVAH-13, USS Enterprise), to MiG-21 North Vietnam 28 December 1972, Lcdr A.H. Agnew POW, Lt. M.F. Haifley KIA
 RF-8 Crusader—29 total, 19 in combat
 First loss: RF-8A (Det. C VFP-63, USS Kitty Hawk), 6 June 1964, to AAA in Laos, Lt. C. F. Klusmann POW
 Final loss: RF-8G 144608 (VFP-63, USS Oriskany), operational loss (non-combat) 13 December 1972, pilot rescued
 S-2 Tracker—5 total, 3 in combat
 First loss: S-2D 149252 (VS-35), unknown combat loss 21 January 1966, 4 crewmen missing
 Final loss: S-2E (VS-23, USS Yorktown), unknown combat loss 17 March 1968, 4 crewmen KIA

USN rotary-wing
 SH-2/UH-2 Sea Sprite—12 lost, 0 in combat
 First loss: UH-2A 149751 (HC-1, USS Hancock), operational loss (non-combat) 10 January 1966, 4 crewmen rescued
 Final loss: UH-2C 149767 (HC-1), operational loss (non-combat) 10 August 1969, 4 crewmen rescued
 SH-3 Sea King—20 lost, 8 in combat
 First loss: SH-3A 148993 (HS-2, USS Hornet), AAA North Vietnam 13 November 1965, 4 crewmen rescued
 Final loss: SH-3D 156494 (HS-7), operational loss (non-combat) 31 December 1972, crew rescued

USN fixed-wing land-based
 OV-10 Bronco—7 total, 6 in combat
 First VAL-4 loss: 155490 was shot down the night of 12 July 1969.  Crash Location: Near Ap Bac, Chau Doc Province, South Vietnam. Both Aircrew members were Killed In-Action
 Last VAL-4 loss: 155461 crashed on 9 February 1972. Crash Location: Into Sea off southwest coast of Vietnam near Rach Gia and Ca Mau. Pilot was Killed In-Action, Copilot ejected and was Wounded In-Action

To increase air support for the SEALORDS Operation in South Vietnam's Mekong Delta, the Navy "borrowed" twenty North American Aviation OV-10A Broncos from the United States Marine Corps. On 3 January 1969 Light Attack Squadron Four (VAL-4) was commissioned at NAS North Island, California and after an intense period of training was transferred to Vietnam. In early April, combat flight operations began from detachments at Binh Thuy and Vung Tau. VS-41 at NAS North Island retained four of the borrowed Broncos to be used for training replacement pilots and maintenance personnel.
 P-3B Orion – 2 lost
 First loss: P3-B 153440 (VP-26, U-Tapao), AAA South Vietnam, 6 February 1968, 12 crewmen KIA
 Final loss: P3-B 153445 (VP-26, U-Tapao), possible AAA South Vietnam, 1 April 1968, 12 crewmen KIA

United States Marine Corps
U.S. Marine Corps aircraft lost in combat included 193 fixed-wing and 270 rotary-wing aircraft.

USMC fixed-wing

 A-4 Skyhawk—81 lost
 A-6 Intruder—25 lost+
 C-117 Skytrain—2 lost
 EA-6A Intruder—2 lost
 EF-10 Skynight—5 lost
 F-4 Phantom—95 lost, 72 combat
 F-8 Crusader—21 lost
 KC-130 Hercules—4 lost
 O-1 Bird Dog—7 lost
 OV-10 Bronco—10 lost

 RF-4 Phantom—4 lost
 RF-8 Crusader—1 lost
 TA-4 Skyhawk—10 lost
 TF-9 Cougar—1 lost

Source for F-4 losses is Phantom with U.S. Marine Corps (Joe Baugher), others are unsourced

USMC rotary-wing

 AH-1 Cobra—7 lost
 HUS-1—75 lost
 UH-1E Huey—69 lost
 CH-37 Mojave—1 lost
 CH-46D Sea Knight—109 lost
 CH-53 Sea Stallion—9 lost

United States Army

USA fixed-wing
 OV-1A/B/C/D Mohawk—65 lost
 O-1 Bird Dog—297 lost
Production of a total of 380 Mohawks ended in December 1970.
When the Vietnam War ended in 1973, Mohawk losses were: one shot down by a MiG, one destroyed by mortar fire, 27 lost to ground fire and 36 destroyed in operational accidents.
U-21 losses need added
U-8 losses need added
u-6 losses need added all are army fixed wing aircraft

USA rotary-wing
5,195+ (which include not in addition to the above statistics)

 Bell 205—1 lost (Air America)
 AH-1G—270 lost+
 BELL—1 lost

 CH-21C—14 lost
 CH-34—2 lost
 CH-37B—1 lost
 CH-37C—1 lost

 CH-47A—83 lost
 CH-47B—20 lost
 CH-47C—29 lost
 CH-54A—9 lost
 H-13D—3 lost
 H-37A—2 lost
 OH-13S—147 lost
 OH-23G—93 lost
 OH-58A—45 lost
 OH-6A—842 lost
 UH-1—60 lost
 UH-1A—1 lost
 UH-1C—365 lost
 UH-1D—886 lost
 UH-1E—90 lost
 UH-1F—18 lost
 UH-1H—1,313 lost
 UH-34D—176 lost

Republic of Vietnam aircraft

 A-1 Skyraider – 225 lost
 A-37A/B Dragonfly – 38 lost
 AC-47 – 9 lost
 C/AC-119G/K Stinger – 8 lost
 C-7A Caribou – 6 lost
 C/EC-47 Skytrain – 17 lost
 C-123K Provider – 11 lost
 C-130A Hercules – 2 lost
 F-5A/B/C/E Freedom Fighter/Tiger II – ~250 lost (including 114 captured)
 U/H-1D/H Iroquois (helicopter) – 332 lost
 C/UH-34C/D/G Choctaw (helicopter) – 140 lost
 CH-47A Chinook (helicopter) – 10 lost
 O-1 Bird Dog – 152 lost
 O-2A Skymaster – 2 lost
 T-41D Mescalero – 1 lost
 U-6A Beaver – 10 lost
 U-17A/B Skywagon – 39 lost

North Vietnam captured 877 South Vietnamese aircraft at war's end.

Royal Australian Air Force

Fixed wing
7 total
 C-7 Caribou—3 total, 1 in combat; all from No. 35 Squadron RAAF
 Caribou A4-193 was destroyed by mortar fire while taxiing at That Son (near the Cambodian border) on 29 March 1970.
 English Electric Canberra—2 total, 2 in combat; both from No. 2 Squadron RAAF
 First loss: Canberra A84-231 disappeared on 3 November 1970 on a night bombing mission in the northern 1st Corps Tactical Zone region of South Vietnam after dropping its bombs near Da Nang. Pilot Officer Robert Charles Carver (24) and Flying Officer Michael Patrick John Herbert (24), were both MIA until 30 July 2009 when their remains were positively identified.
 Final loss: A84-228 shot down by two SA-2 SAM missiles on 14 March 1971; Wing Commander F. J. L. Downing and Flight Lieutenant A.J. Pinches were both rescued.
 CAC Sabre—2 total, 2 in combat; both from No. 79 Squadron RAAF
 First Loss: CA-27 Sabre Mk 32 A94-984; 24 September 1964, crashed 28 nautical miles west of RTAF Ubon, Thailand following engine failure; the pilot, Flight Lieutenant Ian McFarlane ejected
 Final loss: CA-27 Sabre Mk 32 A94-986; 3 January 1968; crashed due to engine failure three miles south west of RTAF Ubon; Pilot Officer Mark McGrath was killed, one Thai national injured (later a fatality) on ground. The first and only fatal crash by an RAAF aircraft in Thailand.

Rotary-wing
 UH-1—6 total, all from No. 9 Squadron RAAF

Democratic Republic of Vietnam Aircraft

Claimed by VPAF: 154 MiG aircraft lost through all causes, including 131 in air combat (includes 63 MiG-17s, 8 MiG-19s and 60 MiG-21s)Article title 

Russian source:  65 MiG-21s, 5 MiG-19s, 75 MiG-17s lost through all causes. 2 Mi-4, 5 An-2, 5 Il-14, 1 MiG-15UTI, 1 Il-28, 1 L-29, 1 Lisunov Li-2 lost through all causes Total: 159 aircraft and 2 helicopter lost.

 People's Republic of China aircraft 
 MiG-17 Fresco—1 thought to be shot down

 Total losses 

See also
 List of United States aerial victories of the Vietnam War

References

Sources
  
 Campbell, John M. and Hill, Michael. Roll Call: Thud. Atglen, PA: Schiffer Publishing Ltd., 1996. .
 Hobson, Chris. Vietnam Air Losses, USAF, USN, USMC, Fixed-Wing Aircraft Losses in Southeast Asia 1961–1973. North Branch, Minnesota: Specialty Press, 2001. .
 Francillon, René. Tonkin Gulf Yacht Club: US Carrier Operations off Vietnam'', Naval Institute Press (1988) 
 
  US Air-to-Air Victories in the Vietnam War

External links
 Widow travels to Vietnam after 40 years and finds her MIA husband's Marine Corps F-4 jet crash site in Que Son Mtns

Aircraft losses
Military history of Australia during the Vietnam War
Military history of the United States during the Vietnam War